Sant'Elena is a comune (municipality) in the Province of Padua in the Italian region Veneto, located about  southwest of Venice and about  southwest of Padua.

Sant'Elena borders the following municipalities: Este, Granze, Monselice, Solesino, Villa Estense.

Demographic evolution

References

Cities and towns in Veneto